Paysandú Fútbol Club are a football club from Paysandú in Uruguay. 

They were formed in 2003, making them one of the youngest football clubs in Uruguay. They were formed by the amalgamation of several local clubs: Barrio Obrero, Centenario, Deportivo América, Estudiantil, Independiente, Juventud Unida, Olímpico and Paysandú Wanderers.

This new club played in the 2005/2006 Primera División Uruguaya, but were relegated back to the 2nd level after finishing bottom of the table.

Football clubs in Uruguay
Sport in Paysandú
Association football clubs established in 2003
2003 establishments in Uruguay